The 1962 Diamond "D" Championship the Canadian women's curling championship was held from February 26 to March 1, 1962 at Regina Stadium in Regina, Saskatchewan.

Team British Columbia, who was skipped by Ina Hansen won the event by finishing round robin play unbeaten with a 9-0 record. This was BC's first championship and the first of two skipped by Hansen.

British Columbia's 18-1 win over Newfoundland in Draw 6 set records for most points scored in a game by one team (18) and the largest margin of victory in a game (17). Both these records still stand as of 2022.

Draw 8 was the first time that every game in a single draw did not go at least the full 10 ends.

Teams
The teams are listed as follows:

Round robin standings
Source:

Round robin results
All draw times are listed in Mountain Time (UTC-07:00)

Draw 1
Monday, February 26 2:30 PM

Draw 2
Monday, February 26 8:00 PM

Draw 3
Tuesday, February 27 9:00 AM

Draw 4
Tuesday, February 27 2:00 PM

Draw 5
Tuesday, February 27 8:00 PM

Draw 6
Wednesday, February 28 2:30 PM

Draw 7
Wednesday, February 28 8:00 PM

Draw 8
Thursday, March 1 2:00 PM

Draw 9
Thursday, March 1 8:00 PM

References

Diamond D Championship, 1962
Scotties Tournament of Hearts
Sports competitions in Regina, Saskatchewan
Curling in Saskatchewan
Diamond D Championship
Diamond D Championship
Diamond D Championship
Diamond D Championship
Diamond D Championship
Diamond D Championship